is the capital and the most populous city of Saitama Prefecture, Japan. Its area incorporates the former cities of Urawa, Ōmiya, Yono and Iwatsuki. It is a city designated by government ordinance. Being in the Greater Tokyo Area and lying 15 to 30 kilometres north of central Tokyo, many of its residents commute into Tokyo. , the city had an estimated population of 1,324,854, and a population density of 6,093 people per km² (15,781 people per mi²).

Etymology 
Sakitama has an ancient history and is mentioned in the famous 8th century poetry anthology Man'yōshū. The pronunciation has changed from Sakitama to Saitama over the years.

With the merger of Urawa, Ōmiya, and Yono it was decided that a new name, one fitting for this newly created prefectural capital, was needed. The prefectural name  was changed from kanji into hiragana, thus  was born. It is the only prefectural capital in Japan whose name is always written in hiragana, and belongs to the list of hiragana cities.

However, Saitama written in hiragana actually finished in second place in public polling to Saitama written in kanji. Despite this, government officials decided to name the new city Saitama in hiragana, not kanji. The sai used in the prefectural name is a rare form of a common character that means "cape" or "promontory".

Geography 
The city is located 20 to 30 km north of central Tokyo, roughly at the center of the Kantō Plain. Situated in the southeast of Saitama Prefecture, the city is topographically comprised by lowlands and plateaus, at mostly less than 20 m above sea level, with no mountain ranges or hills within the city boundaries. The western portion of the city lies on the lowland created by the Arakawa River along with those created by small rivers such as the Moto-Arakawa River, Shiba River, and Ayase River. The rest of the area mostly resides on the Ōmiya Plateau lying in the north-south direction. Dispersed in this region, major rivers flow southward, almost paralleling to one another.

Surrounding municipalities
 Saitama Prefecture
 Ageo
 Hasuda
 Shiraoka
 Asaka
 Kawaguchi
 Toda
 Warabi
 Koshigaya
 Kasukabe
 Kawagoe
 Shiki
 Fujimi

Climate
Saitama has a humid subtropical climate (Köppen Cfa) characterized by warm summers and cool winters with light to no snowfall.

Demographics
Per Japanese census data, the population of Saitama has increased steadily over the past century.

Wards 
Saitama has ten wards (ku), which were assigned official colors as of April 2005:

History 

The city was founded on May 1, 2001, and was designated on April 1, 2003 as a government ordinance. For the histories of Urawa, Ōmiya and Yono before the merger, see:
 Urawa-ku, Saitama
 Ōmiya-ku, Saitama and
 Yono, Saitama, respectively.

On April 1, 2005, Saitama absorbed the city of Iwatsuki to its east, which became a new ward, Iwatsuki-ku.

Government
Saitama has a mayor-council form of government with a directly elected mayor and a unicameral city council of 64 members. Saitama contributes 14 members to the Saitama Prefectural Assembly. In terms of national politics, the city is divided between the Saitama 1st district, Saitama 5th district  and Saitama 15th districts of the lower house of the Diet of Japan.

Elections 
 2005 Saitama mayoral election
The executive mayor, who is directly elected, is Sōichi Aikawa, an independent backed by the Liberal Democratic Party and Komeito. On May 24, 2009, Aikawa lost his bid for reelection against Hayato Shimizu, who was backed by the opposition DPJ.

Economy 
Saitama's economy is principally constituted by commercial business. The city is one of many commercial centers of the Greater Tokyo area and serves Saitama Prefecture, North Kanto, and northeast Honshu.

Saitama is also home to various manufacturers, exporting automotive (Honda manufactures the Honda Legend at Sayama Plant), food, optical, precision and pharmaceutical products. Calsonic Kansei, a global automotive company is headquartered in the city. Iwatsuki is famous for manufacturing of hinamatsuri dolls and ornate kabuto (samurai helmets).

Land use 
The political and administrative center of the city is Urawa Ward (Urawa Station area), and the economic, commercial, and transportation center is Omiya Ward (Omiya Station area). Located approximately 20 km to 35 km from central Tokyo, Saitama City is a satellite city and bed town in the Tokyo metropolitan area, with a day-night population ratio of 92.8 in 2010, which is less than 100 despites being the prefectural capital and an ordinance-designated city (the southeastern part of Saitama Prefecture). (The southeastern area of Saitama Prefecture tends to be a suburb of Tokyo, and the day/night population ratio is particularly low in Minami ward and Midori ward, which are close to the center of Tokyo). Of the 747,000 commuters permanently residing in the city, 175,000, or 23.5%, commute to the Tokyo Special Wards area, making the city home to many so-called "Saitama Tomin". On the other hand, the former Urawa and Omiya cities were designated as core business cities in 1988, and in 2000, Saitama New Urban Center was opened and local branches of various central government offices were relocated from Tokyo.
The southern part of the city, which is closer to Tokyo, tends to have a higher population density than the northern part. In addition, population tends to be concentrated along the Keihin Tohoku Line, Utsunomiya Line, Takasaki Line, and Saikyo Line, which directly connect to central Tokyo, and where both conditions overlap, there is a series of high population density areas of over 20,000 people/km2 from Minami ward to Urawa and Chuo ward.
Urban functions such as administration, commerce, and business are concentrated around major stations such as Urawa, Omiya, and Saitama-new urban stations, which have formed the central urban area since the time of the former Urawa and Omiya cities (the center of the former Yono City is Yono-honmachi Station). The former Omiya City developed as a railroad town and commercial center, and Omiya Station in particular is one of the busiest and most prominent terminal stations in the Tokyo metropolitan area, with all Shinkansen bullet trains stopping there. The Urawa area is also known as an educational district with Saitama University and Saitama Prefectural Urawa High School, as well as an upscale residential area. The Iwatsuki Station area on the Tobu Noda Line (Tobu Urban Park Line) is also a part of the former Iwatsuki City's central urban area.

Transportation 

Representative station is Urawa Station. Saitama is a regional transportation hub for both passengers and freight train lines. Ōmiya Station, part of the Shinkansen high-speed train network, serves as the biggest railway hub in the prefecture.

The closest major airports are Haneda Airport and Narita International Airport, both about two hours away. Honda Airport in Okegawa is for general aviation and offers no scheduled transport services. Commuter helicopter flights to Narita Airport are offered from Kawajima.

Railway stations 
 JR East
  Tōhoku, Akita, Yamagata, Jōetsu and Hokuriku Shinkansen
 
  Utsunomiya Line
  -  - Ōmiya -  - 
  Takasaki Line
 (<<Through to the Utsunomiya Line<<) - Ōmiya -  
  Keihin-Tōhoku Line
  - Urawa -  -  - Saitama-Shintoshin - Ōmiya
  Saikyō Line
  -  -  -  -  - Ōmiya
  Musashino Line
  - Musashi-Urawa - Minami-Urawa - 
  Kawagoe Line
 Ōmiya -  -  -  
  Saitama Rapid Railway Line
 
  Tōbu Railway - Tōbu Urban Park Line
 Ōmiya -  -  -  -  -  -  
  Saitama New Urban Transit ("New Shuttle") - Ina Line
 Ōmiya -  -  -  -  -

Highways
  
 
  Shuto Expressway Ōmiya Route
  Shuto Expressway Saitama Shintoshin Route

Culture

Education

Universities 
 Mejiro University
 Nihon University Faculty of Law
 The Open University of Japan Omiya Study Center
 Saitama University
 Shibaura Institute of Technology
 University of Human Arts and Sciences
 Urawa University
 Nippon Institute of Technology

Junior Colleges 
 Kokusai Gakuin Saitama Junior College
 Urawa University Junior College

Professional Graduate School 
 Omiya Law School

High schools 
 operates prefectural high schools.

The following municipal high schools are operated by the city:

Sports 
Saitama was one of the host cities for the playoffs and the final of the official 2006 Basketball World Championship.

It is home to two J. League football teams: the Urawa Red Diamonds, formerly owned by Mitsubishi, and Omiya Ardija, formerly owned by NTT.

The city and Tokorozawa are home to the Japan Professional Basketball League team the Saitama Broncos.
 Urawa Red Diamonds - J. League football
 Omiya Ardija - J. League football
 Saitama Broncos - bj league basketball  (The base is Saitama Prefecture, main is Saitama, Tokorozawa.)
 Saitama Seibu Lions - NPB (baseball)
 NJPW Dojo - NJPW (professional wrestling)
Since 2013, the city has hosted the Saitama Criterium cycling race sponsored by the Tour de France, held at the end of October.

Mass media 
Most of Saitama Prefecture's mass media presence is concentrated in this city. See Mass media in Saitama Prefecture for details.

Sister cities 
Saitama has six sister cities.
  Toluca, State of Mexico, Mexico (1979)
  Zhengzhou, Henan, China (1981)
  Hamilton, New Zealand (1984)
  Richmond, Virginia, United States (1994)
  Nanaimo, British Columbia, Canada (1996)
  Pittsburgh, Pennsylvania, United States (1998)
  Leipzig, Saxony, Germany (2020)

Visitor attractions 

 Akigase Park
 Besshonuma Park
 Hikawa Shrine
 Minuma Rice Paddies
 Minuma Tsūsen-bori
 Ōmiya Bonsai Village
 Railway Museum
 Saitama New Urban Center
 Saitama Stadium 2002
 Saitama Super Arena
 Saitama Museum of Modern Art
 Irumagawa stable

References

External links 

Official Website 

 
Cities in Saitama Prefecture
Cities designated by government ordinance of Japan
Populated places established in 2001
2001 establishments in Japan